The 1st Yeşilçam Awards, presented by the Turkish Foundation of Cinema and Audiovisual Culture (TÜRSAK) and Beyoğlu Municipality, honored the best Turkish films of 2007 and took place on March 24, 2008, at the Lütfi Kırdar Congress and Exhibition Hall in Istanbul, Turkey.

Awards and nominations

Best Film Award
 Winner:  Bliss directed by Abdullah Oğuz
 At the Bar directed by Serdar Akar
 The White Angel directed by Mahsun Kırmızıgül
 The Edge of Heaven directed by Fatih Akın
 Egg directed by Semih Kaplanoğlu

Best Director Award
 Winner: Fatih Akın for The Edge of Heaven
 Serdar Akar for At the Bar
 Barış Pirhasan for Adam and the Devil
 Abdullah Oğuz for Bliss
 Semih Kaplanoğlu for Egg

Best Actor Award
 Winner: Şener Şen for For Love and Honor
 Haluk Bilginer for Police
 Nejat İşler for At the Bar and Egg
 Uğur Polat for Fog and the Night
 Yetkin Dikinciler for Nazim Hikmet: Blue Eyed Giant

Best Actress Award
 Winner: Özgü Namal for Bliss
 Fadik Sevin Atasoy for Zeynep's Eight Days
 Nurgül Yeşilçay for Adam and the Devil and The Edge of Heaven
 Ülkü Duru for İyi Seneler Londra

Best Supporting Actor Award
 Winner: Tuncel Kurtiz for The Edge of Heaven
 İlyas Salman for Fog and the Night
 Uğur Polat for Nazim Hikmet: Blue Eyed Giant
 Rasim Öztekin for For Love and Honor
 Talat Bulut for Bliss

Best Supporting Actress Award
 Winner: Nursel Köse for The Edge of Heaven
 Derya Alabora for Adam and the Devil
 Lale Mansur for Bliss
 Melisa Sözen for Wish Me Luck
 Özge Özberk for Nazim Hikmet: Blue Eyed Giant

Best Cinematography Award
 Winner: Mirsad Heroviç for Bliss
 Eyüp Boz for Janjan 
 Gökhan Atılmış for Fog and the Night
 Özgür Eken for Egg
 Rainer Klausman for The Edge of Heaven

Best Screenplay Award
 Winner: Fatih Akın for The Edge of Heaven
 İsmail Doruk for Adam and the Devil
 Kubilay Tuncer for Bliss
 Semih Kaplanoğlu & Orçun Köksal for Egg
 Yavuz Turgul for For Love and Honor

Best Music Award
 Winner: Zülfü Livaneli for Bliss
 Fazıl Say for İyi Seneler Londra
 Mahsun Kırmızıgül & Yıldıray Gürgen for The White Angel
 Selim Demirlen for At the Bar
 Shantel for The Edge of Heaven

Digiturk Young Talent Award
 Winner: Saadet Işıl Aksoy for Egg
 Ali Atay for İyi Seneler Londra
 Aslı Tandoğan for For Love and Honor
 Ferit Kaya for Nazim Hikmet: Blue Eyed Giant
 Fıratcan Aydın for Adam and the Devil

Turkcell First Film Award
 Winner: The White Angel directed by Mahsun Kırmızıgül
 İyi Seneler Londra directed by Berkun Oya
 Wish Me Luck directed by Çağan Irmak
 The Last Ottoman: Knockout Ali directed by Mustafa Şevki Doğan
  Police directed by Onur Ünlü

See also
 Yeşilçam Award
 Turkish films of 2007
 2007 in film

External links
  for the awards (Turkish)

References

2008 in Turkey
2007 film awards
Yeşilçam Award
2000s in Istanbul